Dime Magazine is an American basketball magazine that was created by Patrick Cassidy and began circulation in 2001. The magazine publishes six issues a year for its worldwide readership, as well as a handful of editions of Dime China, a Chinese-language version consisting of regular Dime content translated from English and original content from editorial staff in China. It makes an appearance as an endorsement in NBA 2K12, and NBA 2K13. It is owned by Uproxx, itself a subsidiary of Warner Music Group.

History
Dime was created as a "basketball lifestyle" magazine, covering not only the sport but the off-court lives and lifestyles of its athletes and personalities. The concept is reflected in the magazine's tagline, "The Game. The Player. The Life." Whereas most basketball (and sports) magazines only feature athletes wearing their uniforms, Dime often photographs athletes away from the court, wearing casual or business-casual attire. The first issue of Dime had Allen Iverson on the cover. The covers of Dime have featured the biggest names in basketball. The magazine has established a history of giving up-and-coming stars their first-ever international magazine covers, starting with Dwight Howard in 2003 and continuing with the likes of Dwyane Wade, O. J. Mayo, Chris Paul, Tyreke Evans, Lance Stephenson, Brandon Roy, Rajon Rondo and Aquille Carr. Kobe Bryant has had the most Dime covers to date, having appeared on the cover five times.

Magazine features
 "INK" - Photo gallery featuring players' tattoos, where the subject explains the origin behind all or some of his favorite pieces of body art.
 "Baller's Blueprint" - First-person feature where NBA players describe their signature moves and how they execute them.
 "What's My Name?" - One-page profiles on players who are usually not very popular on the mainstream level, often in high school or college. Notable "What's My Name?" alumni include Rudy Gay, Kevin Love, Rodney Stuckey and Blake Griffin. Notable international and female players have also been featured.
 "Big Business" - Articles highlighting people with jobs and careers in the basketball industry; agents, sneaker designers, team owners, etc.
 "Dime Fashion" - Photo gallery where one player models new and upcoming designer fashions.
 "Street Seen" - A "man on the street" photo shoot highlight the current fashion trends among Dime's 18-34 male demographic, often at sneaker boutiques around the country.
 "The Pitch" - Usually a college coach giving a first-person hypothetical recruiting pitch, or someone else with a career in the basketball industry—like an agent—hypothetically pitching a player on their services.
 "Tangled Web" - Short reviews of popular and obscure websites, related and unrelated to basketball.
 "Dimepiece" - A photo spread usually featuring scantily-clad female models with some kind of basketball tie-in.
 "We Reminisce" - Retrospective feature, either an article or a single photo, paying homage to "old-school" basketball players and/or teams.
 "Player's Ball" - Annual NCAA college basketball season preview.

Cover athletes by issue
 Dime #1: Allen Iverson
 Dime #2: Tracy McGrady
 Dime #3: Kenyon Martin
 Dime #4: Baron Davis
 Dime #5: Paul Pierce
 Dime #6: Allen Iverson / Steve Francis
 Dime #7: Kobe Bryant
 Dime #8: Stephon Marbury
 Dime #9: Gary Payton / Dwight Howard
 Dime #10: Ricky Davis
 Dime #11: Ray Allen / Latrell Sprewell
 Dime #12: Philip Champion a.k.a. "Hot Sauce"
 Dime #13: Dwyane Wade
 Dime #14: Amar'e Stoudemire
 Dime #15: Chris Webber
 Dime #16: Carmelo Anthony
 Dime #17: O. J. Mayo
 Dime #18: Fat Joe / Chris Lowery a.k.a. "Skywalker"
 Dime #19: Dwyane Wade
 Dime #20: Jermaine O'Neal
 Dime #21: Vince Carter
 Dime #22: Kobe Bryant
 Dime #23: Chris Paul (This issue also included special-release regional covers of Stephon Marbury, Paul Pierce and Ben Gordon.)
 Dime #24: Tyreke Evans
 Dime #25: Carmelo Anthony
 Dime #26: Dwyane Wade
 Dime #27: Tracy McGrady
 Dime #28: Allen Iverson
 Dime #29: Gilbert Arenas
 Dime #30: Kevin Garnett
 Dime #31: LeBron James
 Dime #32: Kevin Durant
 Dime #33: Chris Bosh
 Dime #34: "The Dream Team" - Lance Stephenson, Tyreke Evans, Jrue Holiday, Derrick Favors & Luke Babbitt
 Dime #35: Greg Oden
 Dime #36: Chris Paul
 Dime #37: Dwight Howard / Carmelo Anthony
 Dime #38: Shaquille O'Neal
 Dime #39: Kobe Bryant
 Dime #40: Michael Beasley
 Dime #41: "The Best Season Ever"
 Dime #42: Lance Stephenson
 Dime #43: Kobe Bryant
 Dime #44: Gilbert Arenas
 Dime #45: Kevin Garnett
 Dime #46: Brandon Jennings
 Dime #47: LeBron James
 Dime #48: Brandon Roy
 Dime #49: Blake Griffin
 Dime #50: Derrick Rose
 Dime #51: Kevin Durant
 Dime #52: Amar'e Stoudemire
 Dime #53: Carmelo Anthony
 Dime #54: Dwyane Wade
 Dime #55: Kobe Bryant
 Dime #56: Rajon Rondo
 Dime #57: John Wall
 Dime #58: LeBron James
 Dime #59: Kevin Durant
 Dime #60: Dwight Howard
 Dime #61: Chris Paul
 Dime #62: Blake Griffin
 Dime #63: Derrick Rose
 Dime #64: Kevin Durant & Russell Westbrook
 Dime #65: Aquille Carr
 Dime #66: John Wall

References

 https://archive.today/20130130015759/http://www.nicekicks.com/2006/08/top-25-sneaker-stores-dime-magazine/
 http://www.blazersedge.com/2009/3/19/803822/the-man-behind-b-roy-s-fir

External links
Website

Bimonthly magazines published in the United States
Sports magazines published in the United States
Basketball magazines
Magazines established in 2001
Warner Music Group